CARRP (Controlled Application Review and Resolution Program) is a policy within United States Citizenship and Immigration Services (USCIS) that aims to prevent selected individuals from obtaining citizenship or immigration benefits. The policy was created in 2008 and mainly targets immigrants from Arab, Middle Eastern, Muslim and South Asian communities., with the top 5 countries being Pakistan, Iraq, India, Iran and Yemen. By law, immigration applications must be adjudicated within 180 days but the program introduces a loop of indefinite delays by citing national security or public safety concerns.
Placement of applications into the program depends on a number of subjective factors and associations such as monetary remittances into middle-eastern countries, loose associations through social media or contact with individuals suspected of being involved in terroristic activities, or unsubstantiated allegations sent to immigration authorities by people opposed to the individuals' immigration efforts.

To date, close to 42,000 people have had their US immigration applications blacklisted through the CARRP program.

Currently, the only known remedy is for individuals to sue the involved agencies in federal court. A number of lawsuits have been filed on behalf of individuals affected by this program, although most have been dismissed after USCIS then approved the complainants applications. The ACLU filed a lawsuit in 2017 (Wagafe et al. vs Trump et al.), which has been certified as a class-action lawsuit for all individuals whose application has been unduly delayed. The suit alleges that the program is both illegal under immigration law and unconstitutional on due process violation grounds. A trial date is set for March 2020

References 

United States Citizenship and Immigration Services
Immigration to the United States
Immigration services
History of immigration to the United States